Central Fife was a constituency of the Scottish Parliament (Holyrood). It elected one Member of the Scottish Parliament (MSP) by the plurality (first past the post) method of election. Also, however, it is one of nine constituencies in the Mid Scotland and Fife electoral region, which elects seven additional members, in addition to nine constituency MSPs, to produce a form of proportional representation for the region as a whole.

The former First Minister Henry McLeish represented the constituency from 1999 to 2003.

From the Scottish Parliament election, 2011, Central Fife was  redrawn and renamed Mid Fife and Glenrothes.

Electoral region 

The other eight initial constituencies of the Mid Scotland and Fife region were; Dunfermline East, Dunfermline West, Fife North East, Kirkcaldy, Ochil, Perth, Stirling and Tayside North.

The region covers all of the Clackmannanshire council area, all of the Fife council area, all of the Perth and Kinross council area, all of the Stirling council area and parts of the Angus council area.

Constituency boundaries and council area 

The  constituency was created at the same time as the Scottish Parliament, in 1999, with the name and boundaries of a pre-existing Westminster (House of Commons) constituency. In 2005, however, Scottish Westminster constituencies were mostly replaced with new constituencies. Most of the Fife Central Westminster constituency was merged into the Glenrothes constituency.

The Holyrood constituency of Central Fife was one of five Mid Scotland and Fife constituencies covering the Fife council area, the others being Dunfermline East, Dunfermline West, Fife North East and Kirkcaldy. All are entirely within the council area.

Fife Central covered a central portion of the council area, south-west of Fife North East, north of Kirkcaldy, and north-west of Dunfermline East.

Constituency profile 

The constituency includes the new town of Glenrothes and the industrial ports of Leven and Methil. The main industries in this region were once coal and linoleum, but nowadays Glenrothes is a centre for the electronics and off-shore oil industries.

Member of the Scottish Parliament

Election results

Footnotes 

Scottish Parliament constituencies and regions 1999–2011
1999 establishments in Scotland
Constituencies established in 1999
2011 disestablishments in Scotland
Constituencies disestablished in 2011
Politics of Fife
Glenrothes
Levenmouth